Hickey is a common surname of Irish origin. The original form is Ó hÍceadha, which is still used in Ireland. Notable people with the surname include:

People

Arts and entertainment
 Adam Hickey (born 1997), English cricketer
 Cheryl Hickey (born 1976), Canadian entertainment reporter for the Global Television Network
 Chris Hickey (singer-songwriter), American singer-songwriter
 Dale Hickey (born 1937), Australian artist
 Dave Hickey (born 1940), American art critic, author of Air Guitar: Essays on Art & Democracy (1998)
 Eddie Hickey (1902–1980), American sportsman
 Emily Henrietta Hickey, Irish author and translator
 Ersel Hickey, American rockabilly singer
 James Harden-Hickey, 19th-century American writer
 John Benjamin Hickey, American actor
 Kenny Hickey, American musician
 Kirsty Hickey (born 1996), English actress
 Michael Hickey, American screenwriter
 Rich Hickey, American computer programmer, creator of the Clojure programming language
 Steve Hickey (footballer) (born 1965), Australian rules footballer
 Tamara Hickey, Canadian actress
 Tom Hickey, Irish actor, known for his role in The Riordans
 Thomas Hickey, 1741–1842, Irish painter
 William Hickey (actor), American actor
 William Hickey (memoirist) (1749–1830), English lawyer and memoirist
 William Hickey (columnist), pseudonymous byline of a gossip column published in the Daily Express
 May Wynn, actress, born Donna Lee Hickey before taking the stage name "May Wynn," after playing a character by that name in The Caine Mutiny

History and current affairs
 Colonel James Hickey (soldier), in charge of the US special forces team which captured Saddam Hussein
 Elizabeth Hickey (1917–1999), Scottish-born Irish historian and writer
 Jim Hickey (broadcaster), New Zealand television presenter
 Thomas Hickey (soldier), executed for mutiny during the American Revolutionary War
 Michael O'Hickey (1860–1916), vice president of the Gaelic League and Chair of Irish at Maynooth

Politics and law
 Bonnie Hickey, Canadian politician
 Eileen Hickey (New York politician) (1945–1999), New York politician
 Eileen M. Hickey (1886–1960), Northern Irish politician
Huhana Hickey, New Zealand Māori lawyer and disability advocate
 James Hickey (Irish politician) (c. 1886 – 1966), Labour TD and Lord Mayor of Cork
 James Hickey (c.1837 – c.1885, Irish Fenian and Land Leaguer
 John J. Hickey, American politician
 Maggie Hickey, Australian politician
Stephen Hickey, British diplomat
 Vivian Hickey (1916–2016), American politician and educator
 William J. Hickey, New York politician and judge

Religion
 Antony Hickey (1586–?) Irish Franciscan theologian
 David Francis Hickey (1882–1973), American-born Catholic bishop in Belize
 Steve Hickey (born 1967), American pastor and politician
 Rev. William Hickey (1787–1875), Irish priest, writer and philanthropist

Science and academics
 Barbara Hickey, Canadian-born American oceanographer
 Joseph Hickey (1907–1993), American ornithologist
 Raymond Hickey, Irish linguist
 Timothy J. Hickey, a professor of computer science

Sports
 Ambrose Hickey (1945–2016), Irish Gaelic footballer
 Anthony Hickey (born 1992), American basketball player, the Israeli Basketball Premier League
 Charles Hickey (cricketer) (1880–1919), New Zealand cricketer
 Charlie Hickey (coach) (born 1964), American college baseball coach
 Chris Hickey, Australian rugby union coach
 Colin Hickey (1931–1999), Australian speed skater
 Denis Hickie, Irish international in Rugby union
 Jack Hickey (rugby) (1887–1950), Australian dual internationalist in Rugby union and Rugby league
 Jarrad Hickey (born 1985), Australian rugby league player
 Jim Hickey (American football) (1920–1997), American
 Jim Hickey (baseball coach) (born 1961), American
 Jimmy Hickie (1915–1973), Scottish footballer (Clyde, Asturias)
 Joe Hickey (born 1929), Australian rules footballer
 Miriam Hickey, American soccer player
 Noah Hickey (born 1978), New Zealand football player
 Noel Hickey, Irish sportsman
 Pat Hickey (born 1953), Canadian ice hockey player
 Pat Hickey (sports administrator) (born 1945), Irish sports administrator
 Red Hickey (1917–2006), American athlete, played American football
 Reg Hickey (1906–1973), player and coach for Geelong in Australian rules football
 Thomas Hickey, Canadian ice hockey player, L.A. Kings

Fictional characters
 Buzz Hickey, in the NBC show Community
 Cornelius Hickey, in Dan Simmons' book and its TV adaptation, both titled The Terror
 Earl Hickey, in the NBC show My Name Is Earl
 Randy Hickey, in the NBC show My Name Is Earl

See also
 Hickey (disambiguation)
Hickley
Hinkley
Mickley (disambiguation)
Tickley
 Irish medical families
 Ó hÍceadha

Anglicised Irish-language surnames
Irish medical families
Surnames of British Isles origin